Giuseppe Dell'Orefice (22 August 1848 – 3 January 1889) born in Fara Filiorum Petri, province of Chieti, was an Italian composer, and conductor best-remembered for his opera Romilda de'Bardi. He died in Naples.

Works
Romilda De'Bardi (1874, Naples) opera in 3 acts
Egmont (1878, Teatro di San Carlo, Naples) opera in 4 acts, libretto by Graziano Fulina
Il Segreto della Duchessa (1879, Naples) opera, libretto by Enrico Golisciani
 Magnificat (for choir and tenor and bass soloists, 1879)
I fantasmi (ballet in 3 acts, 1873)

References

Further sources
F. Florimo, La scuola musicale di Napoli e i suoi conservatori, III, Napoli 1881, pp. 442 s.; 
U. Manferrari, Diz. univ. delle opere melodrammatiche, I, Firenze 1954, p. 306; 
V. De Mura, Encicl. della canzone napol., I, Napoli 1969, p. 252;
C. Schmidl, Diz. univ. dei musicisti, I, p. 428; 
Encicl. della musica Ricordi, II, p. 33; La Musica, Diz., I, p. 506.

External links

Giuseppe Dell'Orefice on italianopera.org

1848 births
1889 deaths
Italian classical composers
Italian male classical composers
Italian opera composers
Male opera composers
Italian conductors (music)
Italian male conductors (music)
People from the Province of Chieti
19th-century classical composers
19th-century conductors (music)
19th-century Italian composers